2K8 may refer to:

 the year 2008
 All-Pro Football 2K8, 2007 video game
 College Hoops 2K8, 2007 video game
 Major League Baseball 2K8, 2008 video game
 NBA 2K8, 2007 video game
 NHL 2K8, 2007 video game